Zoosemiotics is the semiotic study of the use of signs among animals, more precisely the study of semiosis among animals, i.e. the study of how something comes to function as a sign to some animal. It is the study of animal forms of knowing.

Considered part of biosemiotics, zoosemiotics is related to the fields of ethology and animal communication. It was developed by semiotician Thomas Sebeok based on the theories of German-Estonian biologist Jakob von Uexküll. The field is defined by having as its subject matter all of those semiotic processes that are shared by both animals and humans. The field also differs from the field of animal communication in that it also interprets signs that are not communicative in the traditional sense, such as camouflage, mimicry, courtship behavior etc. The field also studies cross-species communication, for example between humans and animals.

See also
Biosemiotics
Phytosemiotics
Zoopoetics

References

Further reading
Sebeok, Thomas A. 1972. Perspectives in Zoosemiotics. Janua Linguarum. Series Minor 122. The Hague: Mouton de Gruyter.
Martinelli, Dario; Lehto, Otto (Eds.) 2009. Special issue: Zoosemiotics. Sign Systems Studies 37(3/4). (esp. G. Kaplan, Animals and music: Between cultural definitions and sensory evidence, 423–453; K. Kleisner, M. Stella, monsters we met, monsters we made: On the parallel emergence of phenotypic similarity under domestication 454–476; S. Pain, From biorhetorics to zoorhetorics, 498–508; K. Tüür, Bird sounds in nature writing: Human perspective on animal communication, 580–613; E. Vladimirova, Sign activity of mammals as means of ecological adaptation, 614–636; C. Brentari Konrad Lorenz’s epistemological criticism towards Jakob von Uexküll, 637–660).
Klopfer, P. (1974), Linguistics: Perspectives in Zoosemiotics. Thomas A. Sebeok. American Anthropologist 76: 939.
Felice Cimatti, 2002. Mente e linguaggio negli animali. Introduzione alla zoosemiotica cognitiva. Roma, Carocci.
Remo Gramigna 2010. Augustine's legacy for the history of zoosemioitcs. Hortus Semioticus  6.
Kull, Kalevi 2003. Thomas A. Sebeok and biology: building biosemiotics. Cybernetics & Human Knowing 10(1): 47–60
Martinelli, Dario 2007. Zoosemiotics. Proposal for a Handbook. Helsinki: Acta Semiotica Fennica 26. Imatra: International Semiotics Institute at Imatra.
Martinelli, Dario 2010. A Critical Companion to Zoosemiotics: People, Paths, Ideas. Biosemiotics 5. Berlin: Springer
Schuler, Werner 2003. Zoosemiose. In: Roland Posner, Klaus Robering and Thomas Sebeok (eds.) 2003: Ein Handbuch zu den zeichentheoretischen Grundlagen von Natur und Kultur / A Handbook on the Signtheoretic Foundations of Nature and Culture. Berlin and New York: Walter de Gruyter, 522–531.
Sebeok, Thomas A. 1990. Essays in Zoosemiotics (= Monograph Series of the TSC 5). Toronto: Toronto Semiotic Circle; Victoria College in the University of Toronto.
Smith, W. John 1974. Zoosemiotics: ethology and the theory of signs. Current Trends in Linguistics 12: 561–626
Turovski, Aleksei 2002. On the zoosemiotics of health and disease. Sign Systems Studies 30.1: 213–219.

 
Animal communication